European Remote Sensing satellite (ERS) was the European Space Agency's first Earth-observing satellite programme using a polar orbit. It consisted of 2 satellites, ERS-1 and ERS-2.

ERS-1

ERS-1 launched 17 July 1991 from Guiana Space Centre aboard an Ariane 4 rocket. The satellite was put into a Sun-synchronous polar orbit at an altitude of 782–785 km. ERS-1 failed on 10 March 2000 after nine years in orbit.

Instruments
ERS-1 carried an array of Earth-observation instruments that gathered information about the Earth (land, water, ice, and atmosphere) using a variety of measurement principles. These included:
 RA (Radar Altimeter) is a single frequency nadir-pointing radar altimeter operating in the Ku band.
 ATSR-1 (Along-Track Scanning Radiometer) is a 4 channel infrared radiometer and microwave sounder for measuring temperatures at the sea-surface and the top of clouds.
 SAR (synthetic-aperture radar) operating in C band can detect changes in surface heights with sub-millimeter precision.
 Wind Scatterometer used to calculate information on wind speed and direction.
 MWR is a Microwave Radiometer used in measuring atmospheric water, as well as providing a correction for the atmospheric water for the altimeter.

To accurately determine its orbit, the satellite included the PRARE (Precision Range and Range-Rate Equipment) and a laser retroreflector. The PRARE became non-operational shortly after launch; later analysis concluded that the failure was due to a memory latchup caused by radiation. The retroreflector was used for calibrating the Radar Altimeter to within 10 cm.

Mission
ERS-1 had various mission phases using 3-day and 35-day repeat cycles. During the geodetic mission, ERS-1 was put in two long repeat cycles of 168 days, which is equivalent to a single 336-day cycle. The geodetic mission allowed for accurate mapping of the Earth's bathymetry and geoid over the seas using the Radar Altimeter.

On 10 March 2000, ERS-1's attitude control system failed due to a gyroscope malfunction and its mission was officially declared finished.

ERS-2

Its successor, ERS-2, was launched on 21 April 1995, on an Ariane 4, from ESA's Guiana Space Centre near Kourou, French Guiana. Largely identical to ERS-1, it added additional instruments and included improvements to existing instruments including:
 GOME (Global Ozone Monitoring Experiment) is a nadir scanning ultraviolet and visible spectrometer.
 ATSR-2 included 3 visible spectrum bands specialized for chlorophyll and vegetation

When ERS-2 was launched, ERS-1 shared the same orbital plane. This allowed a tandem mission, with ERS-2 passing the same point on the ground 1 day later than ERS-1. ERS-2 has a repeat cycle of 35 days.

ERS-2 has been operating without gyroscopes since February 2001, resulting in some degradation of the data provided by the instruments. The tape drive aboard failed on 22 June 2003, leaving the instruments operating only within visibility of a ground station. Since the tape drive failure additional ground stations have been brought online to increase the data gathering abilities of the satellite. The Wind Scatterometer and GOME were the only instruments of their kind until the launches of MetOp-A and Envisat, respectively.

The successor to ERS-2 was the Envisat satellite, launched 1 March 2002. Envisat contained improved versions of many of the instruments onboard ERS-2. However, even after the launch of its successor, the operational life of ERS-2 was increased until 2011, when the decision was made to end the mission. Over a series of burns in July, August and September, ERS-2 was finally depleted of all fuel on 5 September 2011. At 13:16:38 the batteries were switched off and the satellite decommissioned. The spacecraft was left in an orbit where it will reenter the Earth's atmosphere and safely disintegrate within 25 years, in accordance with international standards.

In the final stages of emptying the fuel tanks, it was estimated that they would be empty after a 40-minute burn on 2 September 2011. However, the spacecraft survived both this manoeuvre and a second 40-minute burn on 3 September. On 5 September a third burn was initiated and the fuel tanks were finally drained.

See also

 1991 in spaceflight
 1995 in spaceflight

Notes

References

External links
 ERS homepage at ESA
 Next ESA SAR Toolbox  for viewing, calibrating and analyzing ERS 1 & 2 SAR Level 1 data and higher

Earth observation satellites of the European Space Agency
European Space Agency programmes
Space synthetic aperture radar
Earth satellite radar altimeters
Spacecraft launched in 1991
Spacecraft launched in 1995
Spacecraft launched by Ariane rockets